Svellnosbreahesten is a mountain in Lom Municipality in Innlandet county, Norway. The mountain is surrounded by several other notable mountains including Galdhøpiggen, Keilhaus topp to the northeast; Veslpiggen and Storjuvtinden to the north; Skardstinden to the northwest; Store Tverråtinden, Bukkehøe, and Lindbergtinden to the southwest; and Midtre Tverråtinden and Store Styggehøe to the southeast.

See also
List of mountains of Norway by height

References

Jotunheimen
Lom, Norway
Mountains of Innlandet